The Howie Brothers are an Australian country duo consisting of twin brothers John and Graeme Howie, born 8 December 1950. The brothers have released over 20 albums.

Discography

Charting albums

References

Musical groups from Sydney
1990 establishments in Australia
1992 disestablishments in Australia
Musical groups established in 1990
Sibling musical duos
Musical groups disestablished in 1992